Brigadier General Harry Bluett Liversedge (September 21, 1894 – November 25, 1951), whose regiment figured in the historic raising the flag on Iwo Jima, was a United States Marine who died in 1951 after almost 25 years of service. His last assignment was as director of the Marine Corps Reserve.

The former Olympic track star was awarded his first Navy Cross while leading the crack 1st Marine Raider Regiment in the tough jungle fighting on New Georgia. His second was for extraordinary heroism as commander of the 28th Marine Regiment at the Battle of Iwo Jima. The second citation states in part, "Landing on the fire-swept beaches 22 minutes after H-Hour, (the then) Colonel Liversedge gallantly led his men in the advance inland, executing a difficult turning maneuver to the south, preparatory to launching the assault on Mount Suribachi ..."

Two decades prior, he had been a member of the Naval Academy track squads and participated in the 1920 and 1924 Olympic Games. He also figured prominently in football as a member of the championship Quantico Marines football teams of the early 1920s.

Early life 
On September 21, 1894, Liversedge was born in Volcano, California.

Career

Marine Corps 
General Liversedge began his career in May 1917, when he enlisted as a private, and was commissioned a second lieutenant in September 1918. He was promoted to first lieutenant in July 1919 while serving with the Fifth Brigade in France.

Following his return to the United States in August 1919, he was ordered to the Marine Barracks, Quantico, Virginia, but shortly thereafter was assigned to the Second Provisional Marine Brigade at Santo Domingo, Dominican Republic, arriving in October of that year. In April of the following year he was returned to the United States and played football in the Army-Marine Corps game at Baltimore, Maryland.

1920 Olympics 

In late May 1919 Liversedge passed the pre-selection for the Inter-Allied Games in Paris, France. In late June he took part in the Games and finished second in the shot put. Next year Liversedge represented the United States in the 1920 Olympics at Antwerp, Belgium, winning a bronze medal in the shot put with a distance of 46 feet 5-1/4 inches (14.15 m).

Upon return from the Olympic Games in 1920 and after a tour at the Naval Academy at Annapolis, he was ordered to Marine Barracks, Quantico in March 1922. As aide to Brigadier General John H. Russell, he later sailed to Port-au-Prince, Haiti, but was ordered back to Quantico in August of the same year. He returned to Haiti in December of that year for duty as aide to the American High Commissioner.  In July 1923, he reported for duty again at Quantico.

1924 Olympics 
In the early part of the 1924, Liversedge was transferred to the Naval Academy 

He returned to Quantico in August of that year, this time to attend the Company Officers' Course at the Marine Corps Schools. Upon completion of his course he was transferred to Mare Island, California.  He served at Quantico from September 1926 to February 1927 when he was detached for duty in China. Following his arrival in Asia he was temporarily detached to the Third Brigade at Tientsin to act as boxing coach, and while in Shanghai, participated in the International Track and Field Meets.

In August 1929, he was transferred to Quantico and in November of the same year was ordered to the Marine Corps Base at San Diego, California.

1930–1942 
Following his promotion to the rank of captain in January 1930, he was ordered to Headquarters, Department of the Pacific, San Francisco, in May 1932. There he served as aide-de-camp to the commanding general.

He completed the Senior Course at the Marine Corps Schools and in June 1936, was transferred to serve on the staff of the Basic School, Marine Barracks, Navy Yard, Philadelphia. He was appointed a major in July of that year. Early in 1938 he was again ordered to Quantico, this time to serve with the First Marine Brigade.

In May 1940 another transfer saw the General on the West Coast. There he was assigned duty as the Inspector-Instructor, Fourteenth Battalion, Marine Corps Reserve at Spokane, Washington. Following his promotion to the rank of lieutenant colonel in August 1940, he was ordered to the Marine Corps Base, San Diego, and was subsequently assigned to the 8th Marines, 2nd Marine Division.

World War II 

In January 1942, LtCol Liversedge departed from the United States for American Samoa, in command of the Second Battalion, Eighth Marines. He was promoted to colonel in May of that same year and in August he assumed command of the Third Marine Raider Battalion. He led this unit ashore at Pavuvu in the unopposed occupation of the Russell Island. He commanded the battalion until March 1943 when he was given command of the newly organized First Marine Raider Regiment.

In January 1944, he was transferred to the 5th Marine Division and assumed command of the 28th Marines. He gallantly led the "twenty-eighth" ashore in the Iwo Jima campaign, for which he was awarded his second Navy Cross indicated by a gold star, each star denotes a subsequent award of the same Navy medal. Following a brief tour of duty with the occupation forces in Japan, he was ordered to the Marine Corps Base in San Diego in March 1946. In July 1946 he was assigned duties as director of the Twelfth Marine Reserve District and District Marine Officer, Twelfth Naval District, San Francisco.

Post-war assignments 
Liversedge served in that capacity until he was named assistant commander of the 1st Marine Division, Camp Pendleton, California in February 1948. In May of that year, he was promoted to brigadier general, and the following May, he took command of Fleet Marine Force, Guam, where he remained until April 1950. He then served briefly as deputy commander, Marine Barracks, Camp Pendleton, before becoming director of the Marine Corps Reserve in June 1950.

Personal life 
On November 25, 1951, Liversedge died at the National Naval Medical Center, in Bethesda, Maryland.  Liversedge is buried Pine Grove, California.

Awards & honors 
His military awards include: 
 

Marine Corps facilities named in honor of BGen Harry Liversedge include Liversedge Field at Camp Lejeune, North Carolina and Liversedge Hall at Marine Corps Base Quantico, Virginia.

1st Navy Cross citation

2nd Navy Cross citation

References

Additional sources 

 
 
 Hoffman, Major Jon T. (USMCR). From Makin to Bougainville: Marine Raiders in the Pacific War,  Marines in World War II Commemorative Series.
 Rentz, John M. Marines in the Central Solomons, USMC Monograph, Historical Branch, Headquarters Marine Corps, 1952.

External links

 
 

1894 births
1951 deaths
United States Marine Corps personnel of World War II
Battle of Iwo Jima
Marine Raiders
Recipients of the Navy Cross (United States)
Athletes (track and field) at the 1920 Summer Olympics
Olympic bronze medalists for the United States in track and field
United States Marine Corps generals
Quantico Marines Devil Dogs football players
Quantico Marines Devil Dogs football coaches
Medalists at the 1920 Summer Olympics
Navy Midshipmen men's track and field athletes
Track and field athletes from California
American male shot putters
California Golden Bears men's track and field athletes
California Golden Bears football players
California Golden Bears rugby players
United States Marine Corps reservists